The 1997–98 Perth Glory SC season was the club's second in the Australian National Soccer League (NSL).

Match results

Legend

References

Perth Glory FC seasons